Patrick Soon-Shiong (born July 29, 1952) is a South African-born Chinese-American transplant surgeon, billionaire businessman, bioscientist, and media proprietor. He is the inventor of the drug Abraxane, which became known for its efficacy against lung, breast, and pancreatic cancer. Soon-Shiong is the founder of NantWorks, a network of healthcare, biotech, and artificial intelligence startups; an adjunct professor of surgery and executive director of the Wireless Health Institute at the University of California, Los Angeles; and a visiting professor at Imperial College London and Dartmouth College. Soon-Shiong has published more than 100 scientific papers and has more than 230 issued patents worldwide on advancements spanning numerous fields in technology and medicine.

Soon-Shiong is the chairman of three nonprofit organizations: the Chan Soon-Shiong Family Foundation, which aims to fund research and erase disparities in access to health care and education; the Chan Soon-Shiong Institute for Advanced Health, which is focused on changing the way health information is shared; and the Healthcare Transformation Institute, a partnership with the University of Arizona and Arizona State University. He has been a minority owner of the Los Angeles Lakers since 2010, and since June 2018, he has been the owner and executive chairman of the Los Angeles Times and The San Diego Union-Tribune. , Soon-Shiong is estimated by Forbes to have a net worth of 11.5 billion. He has committed to the Giving Pledge and has pledged to give away at least half of his wealth to philanthropy.

Early life and education 
Soon-Shiong was born in Port Elizabeth, Union of South Africa, to Chinese immigrant parents who fled from China during the Japanese occupation in World War II. His parents were Hakka originally from Meixian District in Guangdong province. His ancestral surname is Wong (黃).

Soon-Shiong graduated 4th out of his class of 189 from the University of Witwatersrand, receiving a bachelor's degree in medicine (MBBCh) at age 23. He completed his medical internship at Johannesburg's General Hospital. He then studied at the University of British Columbia, where he earned a master's degree in 1979, with research awards from the American College of Surgeons, the Royal College of Physicians and Surgeons of Canada, and the American Association of Academic Surgery.

He moved to the United States and began surgical training at University of California, Los Angeles (UCLA), and became a board-certified surgeon in 1984. Soon-Shiong is a Fellow of the Royal College of Surgeons (Canada) and a Fellow of the American College of Surgeons.

Career 
Soon-Shiong joined UCLA Medical School in 1983 and served on that faculty until 1991, as a transplant surgeon. Between 1984 and 1987, he served as an associate investigator at the Center for Ulcer Research and Education. Soon-Shiong performed the first whole-pancreas transplant done at UCLA, and he developed and first performed the experimental Type 1 diabetes-treatment known as encapsulated-human-islet transplant, and the "first pig-to-man islet-cell transplant in diabetic patients." After a period in industry, he returned to UCLA in 2009, serving as a professor of microbiology, immunology, molecular genetics and bioengineering until this date. Soon-Shiong served as a visiting professor at Imperial College, London, in 2011.

Soon-Shiong purchased Fujisawa, which sold injectable generic drugs, in 1998. He used its revenues to develop Abraxane, which took an existing chemotherapy drug, Taxol, and wrapped it in protein that made it easier to deliver to tumors. He was able to quickly move it through the regulatory process and made his fortune with this medicine. In 1991, Soon-Shiong left UCLA to start a diabetes and cancer biotechnology firm called VivoRx Inc. This led to the founding in 1997 of APP Pharmaceuticals, of which he held 80% of outstanding stock and sold to Fresenius SE for $4.6 billion in July 2008. Soon-Shiong later founded Abraxis BioScience (maker of the drug, Abraxane), a company he sold to Celgene in 2010 in a cash-and-stock deal valued at over $3 billion.

Soon-Shiong founded NantHealth in 2007 to provide fiber-optic, cloud-based data infrastructure to share healthcare information. Soon-Shiong went on to found NantWorks in September 2011, whose mission was "to converge ultra-low power semiconductor technology, supercomputing, high performance, secure advanced networks and augmented intelligence to transform how we work, play, and live." It owns a number of technology companies in the fields of healthcare, commerce, digital entertainment as well as a venture capital firm in the healthcare, education, science, and technology sectors. Particular technologies include machine vision, object and voice recognition, low power semiconductors, supercomputing, and networking technologies.
In October 2012, Soon-Shiong announced that NantHealth's supercomputer-based system and network were able to analyze the genetic data from a tumor sample in 47 seconds and transfer the data in 18 seconds. The goal of developing this infrastructure and digital technologies was to share genomic information among sequencing centers, medical research hubs and hospitals, and to advance cancer research and big science endeavors such as The Cancer Genome Atlas. In January 2013, he founded another biotech company, NantOmics, to develop cancer drugs based on protein kinase inhibitors. NantOmics and its sister company, NantHealth, were subsidiaries of NantWorks. Soon-Shiong stated that NantWorks' vision for the future of cancer treatment was a convergence of multiple technologies that included diagnostics, supercomputing, network modeling of sharing data on tumor genes and personalized cocktails of cancer drugs in multi-target attacks, to achieve a sustained disease-free state.

In 2010, with Arizona State University and the University of Arizona, Soon-Shiong founded the Healthcare Transformation Institute (HTI), which he dubs a "do-tank". HTI's mission is to promote a shift in health care in the United States by better integrating the three now separate domains of medical science, health delivery, and healthcare finance. In July 2015, Soon-Shiong initiated an IPO for NantKwest (formerly ConkWest) that represented the highest value biotech IPO in history, at a market value of $2.6 billion. In April 2016, the Los Angeles Times reported that Soon-Shiong received a pay package in 2015 from NantKwest worth almost $148 million, making him one of the highest paid CEOs. Soon-Shiong is also a member of the Berggruen Institute's 21st Century Council.

In 2015, Soon-Shiong's NantPharma purchase the drug Cynviloq from Sorrento Theraputics for $90 million dollars, including more than $1 billion dollars in compensation for reaching regulatory and sales milestones Soon-Shiong did not push forward with FDA approval as the agreement dictated, and instead allowed critical patents and deadlines lapse, presumably due to his financial interest in another drug that would compete with Cynviloq. This "catch and kill" method of eliminating competition follows a pattern of questionable business practices by Soon-Shiong, and claims of "looting" by the cleberity actress and musician Cher.

In early 2016, Soon-Shiong launched the National Immunotherapy Coalition to encourage rival pharmaceutical companies to work together to test combinations of cancer-fighting drugs. He has also met numerous times with former vice president and current US president Joe Biden to discuss more ambitious approaches to fighting cancer, including conducting genomic sequencing of 100,000 patients to create a massive database of potential genetic factors.

In 2017, as announced by press secretary Sean Spicer, then President-elect Donald Trump met with Soon-Shiong at his Bedminster, New Jersey estate to discuss national medical priorities. In May 2017, Soon-Shiong was appointed by House Speaker Paul Ryan to the Health Information Technology Advisory Committee, a committee established by the 21st Century Cures Act.

In 2017, Soon-Shiong and his wife were invited by the Smithsonian to be part of the permanent exhibit "Many Voices, One Nation" in the West Wing of the Smithsonian museum in Washington DC.

In early 2021, Soon-Shiong merged a publicly traded company NantKwest (NASDAQ: NK) with a privately held entity ImmunityBio (formerly NantCell). The new public entity after the merger is known as ImmunityBio, Inc. trading in NASDAQ under ticker symbol: IBRX.

By summer 2021, ImmunityBio had developed a T cell-inducing universal COVID-19 vaccine booster shot had reached Phase III trials in his native South Africa, with a stated goal of completely blocking transmission and stemming an endemic tide of COVID-19 variants. In December 2021, Dr. Soon-Shiong shared pre-clinical results of giving two different vaccine platforms (heterologous) and showed beneficial T cell levels using an adenovirus and mRNA technology.

[40] https://www.nytimes.com/2021/08/12/opinion/sway-kara-swisher-patrick-soon-shiong.html?showTranscript=1

In September 2021, Soon-Shiong and President Cyril Ramaphosa of South Africa announced via a virtual press conference a new venture called NantSA with NantWorks to expand the capability of vaccine development for Africa. NantWorks has signed a collaboration agreement with the South African government’s Council for Scientific and Industrial Research, the South African Medical Research Council (SAMRC) and the Centre for Epidemic Response and Innovation.
 

In January 2022, Soon-Shiong opened a new manufacturing facility and campus in Cape Town, South Africa with President Ramaphosa. Soon-Shiong and his entities are reported to be investing over 4 billion RAND (~$250 million dollars) into the continent.

In Feb 2022, Soon-Shiong announced results from ImmunityBio regarding a clinical trial in Non-Muscle Invasive Bladder Cancer (NMIBC) with a 24.1 median duration and 71% complete remission.

Investments 
In 2013, Soon-Shiong became an early investor in Zoom, a video conferencing company.

In September 2014, NantWorks LLC, a company headed by Soon-Shiong, invested $2.5 million in AccuRadio.

In 2015, NantWorks LLC invested in Wibbitz in their $8 million series B funding.

In February 2018, the Los Angeles Times reported that Soon-Shiong's investment firm NantCapital reached a deal to purchase the paper and The San Diego Union-Tribune from Tronc Inc. for "nearly $500 million in cash" as well as the assumption of $90 million in pension obligations. Soon-Shiong, with this acquisition, became one of the first Asian-Americans to be a media proprietor through ownership in a major daily newspaper in the United States. The sale closed on June 18, 2018.

In September 2018, his company NantEnergy announced the development of a zinc air battery with a projected cost of $100 per kilowatt-hour (less than one-third the cost of lithium-ion batteries).

In 2019, Soon-Shiong became an investor in a graphene based technology company in Europe called Directa Plus. He is currently a 28% owner of the company.

In 2021, Soon-Shiong announced a new investment of $29 million in a biorenewables company called NantRenewables in SeaPoint, Savannah, Georgia.

In 2022, Soon-Shiong invested in Sienza, a lithium battery company in Pasadena, California.

Personal life 
Soon-Shiong is married to former actress Michele B. Chan. They have two children, including Nika Soon-Shiong, and live in Los Angeles, California. He is an avid basketball and football fan.

References 

1952 births
American billionaires
American people of Chinese descent
American health care chief executives
American medical academics
American medical researchers
American philanthropists
American surgeons
Businesspeople from Los Angeles
Businesspeople in the pharmaceutical industry
Giving Pledgers
21st-century philanthropists
Hakka scientists
Living people
Los Angeles Lakers owners
Los Angeles Times people
People from Port Elizabeth
Physicians from California
South African academics
South African billionaires
South African businesspeople
South African emigrants to the United States
South African people of Chinese descent
South African philanthropists
South African surgeons
David Geffen School of Medicine at UCLA faculty
University of British Columbia alumni